"Kill This Love" is a song recorded by South Korean girl group Blackpink. It was released on April 4, 2019, through YG and Interscope, as the lead single for the group's second Korean-language EP of the same name. It was written by Teddy Park and Bekuh Boom and produced by them alongside R.Tee and 24. The single has been described as an electropop song, whose lyrics talk about the girls' decision to end a toxic relationship. A Japanese version of the song was released on October 16, 2019.

An accompanying music video for the song was directed by Seo Hyun-seung and uploaded onto Blackpink's YouTube channel simultaneously with the single's release. Upon release, the music video broke the record for the most views within 24 hours, accumulating 56.7 million views and has, as of December 2022, accumulated more than 1.7 billion views on the platform.

Commercially, the single reached the charts in 27 countries. It peaked at number two in South Korea and became the group's first top-50 hit in the United States and the United Kingdom, thus also becoming the highest-charting female K-pop song on the Billboard Hot 100 at the time. It has been certified gold in France and Japan and silver in the United Kingdom.

Background and release
Yang Hyun-suk, then-CEO of YG announced on February 8, 2019, that Blackpink was set for a comeback with an EP in March. The single and EP were announced on March 25. Between March 31 and April 1, multiple individual teaser pictures were posted onto their social media accounts. On July 26, it was announced that the group would release a Japanese version of their EP Kill This Love on September 11, 2019. The album missed its initial release date and was released on October 16, 2019. No song of the version was released as a single. A live recording of the Japanese version of "Kill This Love", recorded in the Tokyo Dome on December 4, 2019, was included in the group's third live album Blackpink 2019-2020 World Tour In Your Area – Tokyo Dome, released on May 6, 2020, through Universal Music Japan.

Composition

The song was written by Teddy Park and Bekuh Boom, who previously wrote "Ddu-Du Ddu-Du", while production was handled by them alongside R.Tee and 24. Its lyrics have been described as a "breakup anthem" and the song itself has been described as a stomping, brassy electropop track with trap elements. The song contains "blaring horns and martial percussion", with Rosé and Jisoo leading the "impassioned" pre-choruses about breaking up. The song ends with an "imperial rallying cry to cut off the dead weight". Billboard's J.M.K. noted that the group's "girl crush" concept never felt more visceral than with this song.

Music video and promotion
 
An accompanying music video for the song was directed by Seo Hyun-seung and shot in mid-March. It was released simultaneously with the song, 
According to Billboard, the visual features a variety of weapons, ranging from a car being driven with an intent to kill, to a giant hunting trap. The music video also features elements of Greek mythology, such as the fractured Aphrodite statue serving as a metaphor for broken love, and features references to Christianity regarding the ecclesiastical setting.
Upon the music video's release, Kill This Love simultaneously obtained the records of fastest-liked video and fastest viewed video on YouTube, reaching 1 million likes in 28 minutes and 56.7 million views within 24 hours of release, averaging about 650 views per second during that interval and making it the most viewed YouTube video in the first 24 hours after release. Furthermore, it became the fastest video to reach 100 million views on YouTube, doing so in approximately 2 days and 14 hours, beating the record set by fellow Korean artist Psy with "Gentleman" in 2013. It also set the record for the biggest YouTube Premiere with 979,000 concurrent viewers. On April 9, the dance practice video for "Kill This Love" was released on Blackpink's official YouTube channel. South Korean public broadcaster KBS banned the music video "for violating the country's Road Traffic Act", due to a scene in which Rosé is seen driving a car at high speed without a seatbelt.

Blackpink promoted the song on several music programs in South Korea including Show! Music Core and Inkigayo. "Kill This Love" and other songs of the same-titled EP were performed at Coachella on April 12.

Critical reception
"Kill This Love" received mixed reviews from music critics. In a positive review, Erica Russell (Paper) ranked "Kill This Love" as the top song released in 2019, calling it a "perfect sonic synthesis" of all members and an "explosive culmination of the musical styles that ruled the last decade". J.M.K (Billboard) stated that the group's "'girl crush' concept never felt more visceral". In another Billboard listicle, Staff writer Andrew Unterberger ranked the song as the 66th best of the year and called the production "practically biblical". Yannik Gölz (laut.de) called the song a "sensory overload" and that the song is "spectacular, cartoon-like and overdrawn trap-pop packed to the point of irritation", but wished for a better fitting hook.

In a more negative review, Michelle Kim (Pitchfork), called the song's production "weirdly dated" and that the song could've been made in the early 2010s. She also compared the song to Taylor Swift's 2015 single "Bad Blood", "although without a catchy Swiftian hook". Rhian Daly (NME) criticized the track's production calling the chorus "dull" and "a missed opportunity" following the song's buildup. Nur Izzaty Shaifullizan (The Star) compared the song to Blackpink's 2018 single "Ddu-Du Ddu-Du" calling it "hardly better [...] just more of the same".

Commercial performance
In South Korea "Kill This Love" debuted at number 25 of the Gaon Digital Chart with only one and a half day of charting, later peaking at number two the second week, giving the group their sixth top five song. In the United States, the single debuted at number 41 on the Billboard Hot 100 to become the highest-charting Hot 100 hit ever by a K-pop girl group. The song debuted at number 22 on the Streaming Songs chart with 18.6 million streams and rose 48–39 on the Digital Song Sales chart with 7,000 downloads sold. The song stayed in the Hot 100 for a total of four consecutive weeks, making it the longest-charting song by an all-female Korean act on the chart. In the United Kingdom, "Kill This Love" charted at number 33, the highest for any female Korean act at the time. In May 2021, the song was certified silver by the British Phonographic Industry (BPI) for moving 200,000 single-equivalent units, the group's first solo single to do so. The track reached 43.1 million streams in the UK as of September 2022, becoming the group's second most streamed song in the country. In 2021, "Kill This Love" also became Blackpink's second song to surpass 500 million streams on Spotify after "How You Like That" and the second by any female Korean group to reach this mark.

Accolades

Charts

Weekly charts

Monthly charts

Year-end charts

Note: In Australia, the EP ranked at number 18 on the singles chart, but the single was not recognised separately.

Certifications

|-

|-

Release history

See also
 List of most-viewed online videos in the first 24 hours
List of number-one songs of 2019 (Malaysia) 
List of K-pop songs on the Billboard charts
List of Inkigayo Chart winners (2019)

Notes

References

2019 singles
2019 songs
Blackpink songs
Number-one singles in Malaysia
Songs written by Teddy Park
Interscope Records singles
YG Entertainment singles